János Uzsoki (born 9 September 1972) is a retired Hungarian long jumper.

He was born in Mezőtúr. He competed at the 1994 European Championships and the 1996 Olympic Games without reaching the final. He became Hungarian long jump champion in 1994, 1997 and 1999, rivalling with Tibor Ordina. He also became indoor champion in 1998.

His personal best jump was 8.08 metres, achieved in June 1996 in Budapest.

References

1972 births
Living people
People from Mezőtúr
Hungarian male long jumpers
Athletes (track and field) at the 1996 Summer Olympics
Olympic athletes of Hungary
Sportspeople from Jász-Nagykun-Szolnok County